The Mystery of the Flying Express is Volume 20 in the original The Hardy Boys Mystery Stories published by Grosset & Dunlap.

This book was written for the Stratemeyer Syndicate by John Button in 1941. Between 1959 and 1973 the first 38 volumes of this series were systematically revised as part of a project directed by Harriet Adams, Edward Stratemeyer's daughter. The original version of this book was rewritten in 1970 by Vincent Buranelli and retitled to Mystery of the Flying Express.

Because of Dr. John Button's death in 1967, The Mystery Of The Flying Express (1941) entered the Canadian Public Domain on January 1, 2017.

Plot

Revised edition
After the new hydrofoil they are guarding, the Flying Express, is stolen, the Hardy Boys face frequent danger in solving a mystery involving criminals who operate by signs of the zodiac. Eventually they are kidnapped and taken to the Flying Express, but Chet manages to escape and uses their car's emergency light to alert the Coast Guard at which point the boys foul the hydrofoil's propellers and stop the ship.

Original edition
The Hardy boys help their father locate a foreign spy camp hidden somewhere in the western United States. In the original edition, the Flying Express is a daily passenger train used by the spies to send secret messages.

References

The Hardy Boys books
1941 American novels
1941 children's books
1970 American novels
1970 children's books
Grosset & Dunlap books